Peycheva is a Bulgarian surname. Notable people with the surname include:

 Gergana Peycheva (born 2003), Bulgarian chess master
 Khriska Peycheva (born 1955), Bulgarian former swimmer
 Simona Peycheva (born 1985), Bulgarian rhythmic gymnast

Bulgarian-language surnames